Kuchellapadu is a village in the Guntur district of the Indian state of Andhra Pradesh. It is located in Vemuru mandal of Tenali revenue division.pin code 522261.

References

Villages in Guntur district

Kuchellapadu is a peaceful village geographically located 12kms away from nearby town Tenali. The primary occupation of the people of this village is farming. Kuchellapadu is famous for ZP High School that was established during 1960s. Students from nearby villages like Kakarlamudi, Chadalawada, Vellabadu, Chemudubadu Palem used to come to Kuchellapadu school for their education. The school has produced many students that grew up to be Engineers, Doctors, Lawers, Teachers, Professors, Technicians, Business Owners etc. later in their careers.